Hutton Collins Partners is a London-based private equity firm founded in 2002 by Graham Hutton and Matthew Collins, who are both partners in the firm. They own a stake in the Byron Hamburgers chain, which was purchased for £100 million in October 2013 from Gondola Group.

In 2017 Hutton Collins sold majority stake in Byron Hamburgers to Three Hills Capital Partners, retaining a minority stake.

References

External links
 Official website

Private equity firms of the United Kingdom
Investment banking private equity groups
Financial services companies established in 2002
Financial services companies based in London